Abdenour Mahfoudhi (born April 21, 1980 in Aïn Taghrout) is an Algerian football player. He currently plays for MC El Eulma in the Algerian Ligue Professionnelle 1.

External links
 DZFoot Profile
 

1980 births
Algerian footballers
Algerian Ligue Professionnelle 1 players
ES Sétif players
Living people
MC El Eulma players
People from Aïn Taghrout
Association football defenders
21st-century Algerian people